German submarine U-927 was a Type VIIC U-boat of Nazi Germany's Kriegsmarine during World War II.

She was ordered on 25 August 1941, and was laid down on 1 December 1942 at Neptun Werft AG, Rostock, as yard number 514. She was launched on 3 May 1944 and commissioned under the command of Oberleutnant zur See Jürgen Ebert on 27 June 1944.

Design
German Type VIIC submarines were preceded by the shorter Type VIIB submarines. U-927 had a displacement of  when at the surface and  while submerged. She had two shafts and two  propellers.

U-927 was fitted with five  torpedo tubes (four fitted at the bow and one at the stern), fourteen torpedoes or 26 TMA mines, one  SK C/35 naval gun, (220 rounds), one  Flak M42 and two twin  C/30 anti-aircraft guns. The boat had a complement of between 44 — 52 men.

Service history
On 24 February 1945, U-927 was sunk by depth charges, south-east of Falmouth in the English Channel, from a British Warwick of 179/K Squadron RAF. Her crew of 47 were all lost.

There is some doubt to this claim however. On 8 February 1945, U-927 sent her last radio message from position  while she was en route to her operational area in the English Channel. There have been extensive searches by the UK Hydrographic Office and other parties at the claimed wreck site that have failed to find any evidence of a U-boat.

References

Bibliography

External links

German Type VIIC submarines
U-boats commissioned in 1944
World War II submarines of Germany
Ships built in Rostock
1943 ships
Maritime incidents in February 1945
World War II shipwrecks in the English Channel